Muamer Tanković (born 22 February 1995) is a Swedish professional footballer who plays as a winger or a forward for Pafos.

Early life
Muamer Tanković was born to Bosnian Muslim parents in Norrköping and grew up in Hageby, a Million Programme area in the southern part of the city. He started to play football at a young age at the local club Hageby IF, before joining local giants IFK Norrköping in 2005, aged 10.

Club career

Early career
Tanković never made his competitive senior debut for Norrköping in Allsvenskan, but appeared as an unused substitute in six league games. While at Norrköping, Tanković went on trial with German side Hamburger SV. Tanković was also linked with Chelsea, Manchester United and Juventus.

Fulham
In September 2011, he joined Fulham, aged sixteen, on a three-year contract for an undisclosed fee.

He made his Fulham debut as an 87th-minute substitute for compatriot Alexander Kačaniklić in the FA Cup third round replay against Norwich City at Craven Cottage on 14 January 2014 and his Premier League debut on 28 January against Swansea City at the Liberty Stadium, replacing Dimitar Berbatov for the last 7 minutes of a 2–0 defeat. Tanković started his first league match against Manchester United on 9 February 2014 at Old Trafford, and was substituted at half-time for Darren Bent as the game finished 2–2.

Tanković was released by Fulham in May 2014 when his contract expired.

AZ Alkmaar

2014–15
Muamer Tanković signed a five year-deal with the Dutch club AZ on a free transfer in June 2014  At AZ, he linked up with fellow countrymen Viktor Elm and Mattias Johansson.

Tanković scored in his competitive debut for the club on 9 August 2014, in a 3–0 away win against Heracles. He went on to score two goals and provide three assists during the opening four fixtures of the 2014-15 Eredivisie.

On 6 October 2014, in a 2–2 game against Twente, coming on as a sub, he sparked some controversy when celebrating a late equalizer by running out to the sideline and taking a seat at the bench. The gesture was meant as a gibe against manager Marco van Basten, who did not opt to start him in the fixture. In the fourth round of the KNVB Cup, in December 2014, Tanković scored a brace against NEC as AZ won 2–1 and qualified for the quarter finals.

His form declined during the spring of 2015. He eventually finished the season with making 26 league appearances, scoring 5 goals. His last league goal of the season came against Feyenoord on 14 December 2014, in a 2–2 draw.

2015–16
Tanković started the season as a rotation player, but soon accelerated into goal scoring form. In late September 2015, Tankovic scored a brace in a KNVB Cup win against VVV-Venlo. He followed it up a week later by scoring one goal and providing one assist in a 3–1 league win against Heracles. He was named as the single best player in the Eredivisie "team of the week" by the football statistics website Whoscored.

Tanković appeared in 7 of AZ's games in the 2015–16 Europa League, where the club got knocked out in the group stage after finishing at the foot of the table. He made his continental senior debut in a game against the Turkish side Istanbul Basaksehir on 30 July 2015.

Once again, his form declined as the season progressed. Tanković got no to little playing time during the second half of the season, and ended up featuring in 19 league games. His scoring tally remained at 3 goals.

2016–17
During the season, Tanković was used sparingly by manager John van den Brom. At times he was made available to play for feeder club Jong AZ in the Dutch third tier, Tweede Divisie.

His season had a few highlights, however. On 3 December 2016, Tanković scored one goal and provided one assist as AZ drew 1–1 against Excelsior in the league.

Weeks later, Tanković scored a long range strike against the Russian outfit Zenit Saint Petersburg in a 3–2 win in the 2016–17 Europa League. His decisive goal meant that AZ finished second in their group, thus qualifying for the tournament's round of 32.

Hammarby IF

2017
On 10 August 2017, Tanković transferred to Hammarby, thus returning to his native country. The transfer fee was undisclosed, but reports suggested that he moved on a free. Tanković signed a three-year contract with the Stockholm-based side. He made his debut for the side only a few days later, coming on as a second half sub, in a 2–2 home draw against Östersund. Tanković scored his first competitive goal for the club on 16 August, in a 3–1 win against Akropolis in round 2 of the 2017–18 Svenska Cupen. During the fall, Tanković struggled to produce points and received heavy criticism from pundit Alexander Axén, before scoring his first league goal for Hammarby in a 1–3 loss against Halmstads on the ultimate match day of 2017.

2018
In 2018, Tanković played all 30 league games for Hammarby, scoring 7 goals, as the club finished 4th in the table. After the season, Tankovic was voted "Allsvenskan newcomer of the year".

2019
Tanković retained his fine form during the 2019 season, as Hammarby finished 3rd in the league. He scored 14 goals and provided 7 assists in 28 league games. At the end of the year, Tanković was nominated to the prize as "Midfielder of the year" and "Most valuable player in Allsvenskan", eventually missing out on both awards. Tanković reportedly attracted interest from Italian Serie A club Genoa and Super League Greece club AEK Athens ahead of the 2020 international January transfer window.

2020
Tanković started out the 2020 season by scoring 3 goals in the first 10 games of the Allsvenskan campaign. On 31 July, his contract with Hammarby expired and he reportedly attracted interest from clubs such as Queens Park Rangers, AEK Athens and Beşiktaş. However, on 22 August, Tanković decided to sign a new two and a half-year contract with Hammarby.

AEK Athens
On 6 October 2020, Tanković signed a four year-deal with the Greek club AEK Athens. He had a release clause in his contract with Hammarby IF, which meant that he moved on a free transfer. On 29 October 2020, he scored with a close shot in a 2–1 home defeat against Leicester City for the second game of the Europa League group stage. On 5 November 2020, he scored in a 4–1 away win 2020–21 UEFA Europa League group stage game against FC Zorya Luhansk helping AEK to increase the possibility of qualifying for the next phase of the UEFA Europa League.

On 20 December 2020, he scored with a direct corner kick, in a 2–2 home draw against Volos, becoming the second player to do so, after Levi García a week earlier.

On 10 February 2021, he scored a brace in a 4–2 home win against Volos for the first leg of the Greek Cup quarter finals. On 11 April 2021, he scored with a penalty opening the score in a 3–1 away win against Aris Thessaloniki.

International career
Tanković was called by Sweden after being watched by the head coach, Erik Hamrén, and made his international debut for Sweden on 5 March 2014 against Turkey coming on as a substitute for Jimmy Durmaz in the 67th minute.

After a five-year absence, Tanković was called up to the Swedish squad for the training tour in January 2019. He made his return on the pitch in a 2–2 draw against Iceland.

Tankovic made his competitive international debut in a UEFA Euro 2020 qualifying game against the Faroe Islands national football team on 18 November 2019, which Sweden won 3–0.

Personal life
Tanković is of Bosnian descent, and while playing for Sweden in the Euro Under-19 Championship qualifiers against Bosnia and Herzegovina, he scored a hat-trick but did not celebrate out of respect for his parents' homeland. He has an older cousin named Armin Tanković who plays football in Sweden.

He is nicknamed "Mujo".

Style of play
Inspired by his idol Zlatan Ibrahimović, Tanković described himself as a "technical player" that he can score and has vision. He also known for "super skills, eye for goal and clever passing". Newspaper The Independent described Tanković's ability as "effective", due to his main forward position, his key attributes – guile, creativity and vision, as well as, his "excellent movement that it make him hard to track as he operates between the lines."

Career statistics

Club

International
Appearances and goals by national team and year

Honours
Individual

 Allsvenskan newcomer of the year: 2018

References

External links

 
 
 
 
 
 

1995 births
Living people
Swedish footballers
IFK Norrköping players
Fulham F.C. players
AZ Alkmaar players
Jong AZ players
Hammarby Fotboll players
AEK Athens F.C. players
Pafos FC players
Premier League players
Eredivisie players
Allsvenskan players
Super League Greece players
Cypriot First Division players
Association football forwards
Swedish expatriate footballers
Swedish people of Bosnia and Herzegovina descent
Sweden youth international footballers
Sweden under-21 international footballers
Sweden international footballers
Swedish expatriate sportspeople in England
Expatriate footballers in England
Expatriate footballers in the Netherlands
Expatriate footballers in Greece
Expatriate footballers in Cyprus
Footballers at the 2016 Summer Olympics
Olympic footballers of Sweden
Sportspeople from Norrköping
Footballers from Östergötland County